The 2021–2022 Bikarkeppni karla, named Vís bikarinn for sponsorship reasons, was the 56th edition of the Icelandic Men's Basketball Cup, won by Stjarnan against Þór Þorlákshöfn. The competition was managed by the Icelandic Basketball Association (KKÍ) and the cup final was played in Smárinn, Kópavogur, and broadcast live on RÚV. David Gabrovšek was named the Cup Finals MVP after turning in 29 points and 7 rebounds.

Bracket

Cup Finals MVP

References

External links
2021–2022 Tournament results

Men's Cup
Iceland